William Brownlee was an association football player who represented New Zealand, playing in New Zealand's first ever official international.

Brownlee made his full All Whites debut in New Zealand's inaugural A-international fixture, beating Australia 3–1 on 17 June 1922 and ended his international playing career with four A-international caps to his credit, his final cap an appearance in a 3–2 win over Australia on 16 June 1923.

References

External links
 

Year of birth missing
Year of death missing
New Zealand association footballers
New Zealand international footballers
Association football midfielders